Fruitland is an unincorporated community in Richmond County, North Carolina, United States.

References

Unincorporated communities in Richmond County, North Carolina
Unincorporated communities in North Carolina